Macclesfield was, from 1974 to 2009, a local government district with borough status in Cheshire, England. It included the towns of Bollington, Knutsford, Macclesfield and Wilmslow and within its wider area the villages and hamlets of Adlington, Disley, Gawsworth, Kerridge, Pott Shrigley, Poynton, Prestbury, Rainow, Styal, Sutton and Tytherington.

History
The district was formed on 1 April 1974 under the Local Government Act 1972.  It was a merger of Macclesfield municipal borough, Alderley Edge, Bollington, Knutsford and Wilmslow urban districts, along with the single parish Disley Rural District, Macclesfield Rural District and part of Bucklow Rural District. The new district was awarded borough status from its creation, allowing the chairman of the council to take the title of mayor.

In 2006 the Department for Communities and Local Government considered reorganising Cheshire's administrative structure as part of the 2009 structural changes to local government in England. The decision to merge the boroughs of Macclesfield, Congleton and Crewe and Nantwich to create a single unitary authority was announced on 25 July 2007, following a consultation period in which a proposal to create a single Cheshire unitary authority was rejected.

The Borough of Macclesfield was abolished on 1 April 2009, when the new Cheshire East unitary authority was formed.

Civil parishes
The borough contained 52 civil parishes and 2 discrete unparished areas (namely, the towns of Macclesfield and Wilmslow). Of the 52 civil parishes, five (Agden, Little Bollington, Macclesfield Forest and Wildboarclough, Tatton, and Wincle) held parish meetings rather than elect a parish council. Of the remaining 47 civil parishes, two contained towns (Bollington and Knutsford) and so had town councils rather than parish councils administering them. A number of adjacent or abutting civil parishes were grouped together under a single parish council: Ollerton with Marthall, Plumley with Toft and Bexton, and Tabley (for the parishes of Tabley Inferior and Tabley Superior) The remaining 37 civil parishes had their own parish council.

The following civil parishes were included in the borough:

 Adlington
 Agden
 Alderley Edge
 Ashley
 Aston by Budworth
 Bexton
 Bollington (town)
 Bosley
 Chelford
 Chorley
 Disley
 Eaton
 Gawsworth
 Great Warford
 Henbury
 High Legh
 Higher Hurdsfield
 Kettleshulme
 Knutsford (town)
 Little Bollington
 Little Warford
 Lower Withington
 Lyme Handley
 Macclesfield Forest and Wildboarclough
 Marthall
 Marton
 Mere
 Millington
 Mobberley
 Mottram St Andrew
 Nether Alderley
 North Rode
 Ollerton
 Over Alderley
 Peover Inferior
 Peover Superior
 Pickmere
 Plumley
 Pott Shrigley
 Poynton with Worth
 Prestbury
 Rainow
 Rostherne
 Siddington
 Snelson
 Sutton
 Tabley Inferior
 Tabley Superior
 Tatton
 Toft
 Wincle

Political control
The town of Macclesfield had been a municipal borough from 1836 to 1974 with a borough council. The first elections to the new Macclesfield Borough created under the Local Government Act 1972 were held in 1973, initially operating as a shadow authority until the new arrangements came into effect on 1 April 1974. Political control of the council from 1974 until its abolition in 2009 was held by the following parties:

Leadership
The leaders of the council from 1983 were:

Wesley Fitzgerald went on to become the first leader of Cheshire East Council.

Composition
The political composition of the council at its abolition in 2009 was:

Council elections
1973 Macclesfield Borough Council election
1976 Macclesfield Borough Council election
1979 Macclesfield Borough Council election (New ward boundaries)
1980 Macclesfield Borough Council election
1982 Macclesfield Borough Council election
1983 Macclesfield Borough Council election (Borough boundary changes took place but the number of seats remained the same)
1984 Macclesfield Borough Council election
1986 Macclesfield Borough Council election
1987 Macclesfield Borough Council election
1988 Macclesfield Borough Council election
1990 Macclesfield Borough Council election
1991 Macclesfield Borough Council election
1992 Macclesfield Borough Council election
1994 Macclesfield Borough Council election (Borough boundary changes took place but the number of seats remained the same)
1995 Macclesfield Borough Council election
1996 Macclesfield Borough Council election
1998 Macclesfield Borough Council election
1999 Macclesfield Borough Council election (New ward boundaries)
2000 Macclesfield Borough Council election
2002 Macclesfield Borough Council election
2003 Macclesfield Borough Council election
2004 Macclesfield Borough Council election
2006 Macclesfield Borough Council election
2007 Macclesfield Borough Council election

By-election results

Notes and references

Districts of England established in 1974
English districts abolished in 2009
Former non-metropolitan districts of Cheshire
Former boroughs in England
Borough of
 
Council elections in Cheshire
District council elections in England